The Cape wagtail (Motacilla capensis), also known as Wells's wagtail, is a small insectivorous bird which is widespread in southern Africa. It frequents water's edge, lawns and gardens. It is a mostly resident, territorial species, but has been known to undertake limited altitudinal migration or form flocks outside of the breeding season. Like other wagtails they are passerine birds of the family Motacillidae, which also includes the pipits and longclaws.

Taxonomy
In 1760, French zoologist Mathurin Jacques Brisson included a description of the Cape wagtail in his  based on a specimen collected from the Cape of Good Hope. He used the French name  and the Latin . Although Brisson coined Latin names, these do not conform to the binomial system and are not recognised by the International Commission on Zoological Nomenclature. When in 1766 the Swedish naturalist Carl Linnaeus updated his Systema Naturae for the twelfth edition, he added 240 species that had been previously described by Brisson. One of these was the Cape wagtail. Linnaeus included a brief description, coined the binomial name Motacilla capensis and cited Brisson's work. The genus Motacilla had been introduced in 1758 by the Linnaeus in the tenth edition of his . The specific name capensis denotes the Cape of Good Hope.

Three subspecies, occurring in three distinct regions are currently recognised: 
Motacilla capensis subsp. simplicissima Neumann, 1929 – Angola to southeastern DRC, Zambia, the Caprivi Strip, northern Botswana and western Zimbabwe;
Motacilla capensis subsp. capensis Linnaeus, 1766 – Namibia, South Africa, Lesotho, Eswatini, Zimbabwe and central Mozambique;
Motacilla capensis subsp. wellsi Ogilvie-Grant, 1911 – Highlands of the eastern DRC to Uganda and Kenya.

Description
The Cape wagtail has a dull plumage and a relatively short tail, with olive grey breast and face, with a tan supercilium and dark lores. The underparts are creamy white and may show a faint pinkish wash on the lower breast and belly. The breast band is dusky and the sides of the breast and the flanks are olive-grey. The brownish black wings have pale edges to the feathers and the tail is blackish with the two outer tail feathers being white. The juveniles are similar to the adults but browner above and yellower below. There is no colour or plumage distinction between males and females. The Wagtail also has an iconic black triangle on its chest.

Distribution and habitat

Cape wagtails are found in eastern and southern Africa from Uganda, the eastern DRCongo and Kenya, through Zambia and Angola to southern Africa, south to the Western Cape and the Cape of Good Hope.

Cape wagtails can be found in almost any habitat that has open ground adjacent to water, and also along the rocky coastline, in farms, villages, cultivated land, parks, gardens and urban centres. In east Africa it is generally found above  in altitude.

Behaviour
The Cape wagtail's main food is invertebrates. Foraging occurs mainly on the ground or in shallow water, and they will consume carrion. It has been observed feeding on insects attracted by lights or caught in car radiators. It has also been recorded as eating fiddler crabs, sandhoppers, snails, ticks, tadpoles, small fish, small chameleons and human food.

The Cape wagtail is a monogamous, territorial solitary nester, and breeding pairs stay together over a number of breeding seasons. Like many territorial birds, the males will fiercely attack their own reflection when seen in mirrors or windows. The nest is built by both sexes and consists of a cup made of a wide range of materials, both natural and artificial, which is lined with hair, rootlets, wool and feathers. The nest is situated in a recess within a steep bank, tree, or bush, or in a man-made location such as a hole in a wall, a pot plant, or a bridge. It breeds all year round but, egg-laying peaks from July until December (mid-winter to early summer). Between one and five eggs are laid, which both parents take turns incubating for 13–15 days. Once hatched, the chicks are fed by both parents, until they leave the nest after 14–18 days. Once fledged they adults continue to feed them for another 20–25 days, and the young become fully independent around 44 days - 60 days after fledging.

It has been recorded as host of the following brood parasites: Diderick cuckoo Chrysococcyx caprius, Jacobin cuckoo Clamator jacobinus, and Levaillant's cuckoo Clamator levaillantii. Predators include the rufous-breasted sparrowhawk Accipter rufiventris, as well as cats and rats Rattus spp.

Gallery

References

 Sinclair, Hockey and Tarboton, SASOL Birds of Southern Africa,

External links

 Cape wagtail - Species text in The Atlas of Southern African Birds.

Cape wagtail
Birds of Southern Africa
Birds of Sub-Saharan Africa
Cape wagtail
Taxa named by Carl Linnaeus